Quekettia  may refer to:
 Quekettia (plant), a plant genus in the family Orchidaceae
 Quekettia (spider), an animal genus in the family Salticidae